João Henrique Holanda Caldas (born 22 July 1987) often referred to as JHC is a Brazilian politician and lawyer. He has spent his political career representing Alagoas, having served as federal deputy representative since 2011.

Personal life
Caldas is the son of João Caldas da Silva and Eudócia Maria Holanda de Araújo. His father is also a politician, having served in the chamber of deputies as well. He is an alumnus of the Centro Universitário Cesmac (CESMAC). Caldas is a member of the neo-Pentecostal church Igreja Internacional da Graça de Deus. Caldas has also worked as a lawyer.

Political career
In the 2009 local elections Caldas was elected to the legislative assembly of Alagoas. In the following year in the 2010 Brazilian general election Caldas was elected to the federal senate.

Caldas voted in favor of the impeachment motion of then-president Dilma Rousseff. Caldas voted against the 2017 Brazilian labor reform, and would vote in favor of opening a corruption investigation into Rousseff's successor Michel Temer.

References

1987 births
Living people
People from Maceió
21st-century Brazilian lawyers
Brazilian Pentecostals
Members of the International Grace of God Church
Brazilian Socialist Party politicians
Members of the Chamber of Deputies (Brazil) from Alagoas
Members of the Legislative Assembly of Alagoas